Shadi Hamid (born 1983) is an American author and a senior fellow at the Brookings Institution. He is also a contributing writer at The Atlantic as well as research professor of Islamic studies at Fuller Seminary. This appointment is the first time a Muslim scholar has been hired in the school's history. He has been called a "prominent thinker on religion and politics" in the New York Times and was named as one of "The world's top 50 thinkers" in 2019 by Prospect Magazine. He is known for coining the phrase "Islamic exceptionalism" to describe Islam's resistance to secularization and outsized role in public life, but it has come under some criticism.

Early life and education
Hamid was born into a Muslim family of Egyptian ancestry in Pennsylvania. A Marshall Scholar, Hamid completed his doctoral degree in politics at Oxford University in 2010.  His dissertation was titled Democrats without Democracy: the Unlikely Moderation of the Muslim Brotherhood in Egypt and Jordan. Hamid received his B.S. and M.A. from Georgetown University's School of Foreign Service.

Research
Hamid was a Hewlett Fellow at Stanford University's Center on Democracy, Development and the Rule of Law and a Fulbright Fellow in Jordan, researching Islamist participation in the democratic process, and a research fellow at the American Center for Oriental Research in Amman, where he conducted research on the relationship between the Muslim Brotherhood and the Jordanian government.

He is the author of three books and his articles have appeared in The New York Times, The Washington Post, The Wall Street Journal, Time, Foreign Affairs, Foreign Policy, and The New Republic. He also regularly appears on television, including CNN, Fox News, MSNBC, and PBS.

Books

Reception
Islamic Exceptionalism: How the Struggle Over Islam is Reshaping the World was shortlisted for the 2017 Lionel Gelber Prize. Temptations of Power: Islamists and Illiberal Democracy in a New Middle East was named a Foreign Affairs "Best Book of 2014."

References

1983 births
Living people
American political scientists
American male non-fiction writers
American Muslims
American people of Egyptian descent
Brookings Institution people
Alumni of the University of Oxford
Walsh School of Foreign Service alumni
21st-century American academics
21st-century American male writers
21st-century American non-fiction writers
Date of birth missing (living people)
Place of birth missing (living people)